The 1973–74 English football season was Aston Villa's 74th season in the Football League, this season playing in the Football League Second Division. Under manager Vic Crowe Aston Villa won promotion and thus ended their two-year spell in the Third Division. By the end of the decade they would be firmly re-established as a First Division club. But Vic Crowe was sacked in April 1974. Ron Saunders was appointed manager in June 1974.

The New Year's Day fixture saw Villa draw 0–0 with Millwall before a home crowd of 20,905 leaving Villa in 13th position. Within the month, Arsenal fall at the feet of Sammy Morgan.

Second Division

References

External links
AVFC History: 1973-74 season

Aston Villa F.C. seasons
Aston Villa F.C. season